Streptomyces apocyni is a bacterium species from the genus Streptomyces which has been isolated from the plant Apocynum venetum from Xinjiang in China.

See also 
 List of Streptomyces species

References 

apocyni
Bacteria described in 2020